Carlos Andrés Quiñónez (born August 18, 1980) is a retired Ecuadorian footballer who played as a Right winger (football). He played his entire professional soccer career (2000-2012) for the top level Ecuadorian club Emelec.

Playing style
As a youth player he tried-out for Dutch giant AFC Ajax where he spent about a year but never got a chance to play in their first team. In 1999, he returned to Ecuador, where he played a few matches for the sub18 division of Emelec. In 2000,  he made his debut in Emelec's First Division squad and remained with the club until 2012, year in which he retired from professional soccer.

External links

1980 births
Living people
People from Muisne
Ecuadorian footballers
Ecuador international footballers
Ecuadorian expatriate footballers
Association football defenders
Ecuadorian Serie A players
C.S. Emelec footballers